Green Grass Creek is a stream in the U.S. state of South Dakota.

Some say Green Grass Creek takes its name from the unusually green grass on the spring-fed creek, while others believe abundant hay along the watercourse caused the name to be selected.

See also
List of rivers of South Dakota

References

Rivers of Dewey County, South Dakota
Rivers of Ziebach County, South Dakota
Rivers of South Dakota